H. Dugald Macpherson is a mathematician and logician. He is Professor of Pure Mathematics at the University of Leeds.

He obtained his DPhil from the University of Oxford in 1983 for his thesis entitled "Enumeration of Orbits of Infinite Permutation Groups" under the supervision of Peter Cameron. In 1997, he was awarded the Junior Berwick Prize by the London Mathematical Society. He continues to research into permutation groups and  model theory. He is scientist in charge of the MODNET team at the University of Leeds. He co-authored the book Notes on Infinite Permutation Groups.

References

External links
 Prof. Macpherson's homepage

Year of birth missing (living people)
20th-century British mathematicians
21st-century British mathematicians
Living people
Alumni of the University of Oxford
Academics of the University of Leeds
Model theorists
Place of birth missing (living people)